Pevchy dyak is a historical name of singer's occupation in Russia. They were singers at tsar's court and in church choirs of higher church hierarchs: patriarch, metropolitan, archiereus (bishop of the Eastern Orthodox Church).

The title (in both senses) was abolished by Peter the Great in 1720s during his massive reforms of the Russian state.

See also
Dyachok

References 

Obsolete occupations
Singing
Tsardom of Russia
Russian Empire